Penguin Prison is an electropop project composed solely of New York City singer, musician, producer and remixer Chris Glover.  Penguin Prison's self-titled debut album was released on 18 October 2011 through Downtown Records to positive reviews.

Biography

Early life
Chris Glover was born in 1983 grew up in New York City's Upper East Side. His early musical influences came mostly from his mother's love of country music. Glover's favorite artists growing up were Johnny Cash, Patsy Cline, and Hank Williams. Glover showed an interest in performing music at an early age when he joined his school's gospel choir at age 10, singing alongside future R&B artist Alicia Keys. While a teen, he performed at CBGB's with his punk band The Museum. He attended the Bard College, where he formed a popular "crazy, fake boy band" called The Smartest People At Bard, which he describes as "a cross between Backstreet Boys and Beastie Boys". In the mid-2000s, before releasing music as Penguin Prison, he went by his birth name and recorded an unreleased pop-rap album, Hell Isn't Even That Funny, which was promoted with the single "Stand On Your Seat" (2005).

Remixes
Penguin Prison is known for remixing, among others, the Jamiroquai song "White Knuckle Ride" the Darren Hayes song "Talk Talk Talk", the Ellie Goulding song "Starry Eyed", the Imagine Dragons song "It's Time", the Faithless song "Feel Me Now" and the Marina and the Diamonds song "I Am Not a Robot".

Discography
Studio albums
Penguin Prison (2011)
Lost in New York (May 5, 2015)

Singles
Calling Out (October 14, 2014)
Calling Out Remix EP (December 15, 2014)
Never Gets Old (February 10, 2015)
Turn It Up EP (October 27, 2017)
The Heat (May 10, 2019)
Better (October 9, 2020)

References

External links
 

2008 establishments in New York City
Remixers
Downtown Records artists